There are at least 100 named trails in Park County, Wyoming according to the U.S. Geological Survey, Board of Geographic Names.  A trail is defined as: "Route for passage from one point to another; does not include roads or highways (jeep trail, path, ski trail)."
 Anderson Creek Trail, el.  
 Beartooth Highlakes Trail, el.  
 Beartooth Loop National Recreation Trail, el.  
 Beauty Lake Trail, el.  
 Beaver Lakes Loop Trail, el.  
 Beaver Lakes Loop Trail, el.  
 Bighorn Pass Trail, el.  
 Blackwater Trail, el.  
 Boulder Basin Trail, el.  
 Buffalo Plateau Trail, el.  
 Buffalo Plateau Trail, el.  
 Butte Creek Trail, el.  
 Cascade Creek Trail, el.  
 Clay Butte Trail, el.  
 Clear Creek Trail, el.  
 Copeland Lake Trail, el.  
 Cougar Creek Trail, el.  
 Coyote Creek Trail, el.  
 Coyote Creek Trail, el.  
 Crandall Cutoff Trail, el.  
 Crandall Trail, el.  
 Crazy Lakes Trail, el.  
 Crazy Mountain Trail, el.  
 Crescent Trail, el.  
 Fawn Pass Trail, el.  
 Fire Memorial Trail, el.  
 Frost Lake Trail, el.  
 Glacial Boulder Trail, el.  
 Gneiss Creek Trail, el.  
 Gooseberry Trail, el.  
 Granite Loop Trail, el.  
 Greybull River Trail, el.  
 Greybull River Trail, el.  
 Haymaker Timber Creek Trail, el.  
 Howard Eaton Trail, el.  
 Ice Lakes Trail, el.  
 Ishawooa Mesa Trail, el.  
 Ishawooa Trail, el.  
 Jack Creek Trail, el.  
 Jim Bridger Trail, el.  
 Jim Bridger Trail, el.  
 Jones Pass Trail, el.  
 Lake Reno Trail, el.  
 Lamar River Trail, el.  
 Lewis and Clark National Historic Trail, el.  
 Little Venus Cutoff Trail, el.  
 Lodgepole Trail, el.  
 Lost Lake Trail, el.  
 Lower Blacktail Trail, el.  
 Lower Blacktail Trail, el.  
 Marbel Mountain Trail, el.  
 Miller Creek Trail, el.  
 Mist Creek Trail, el.  
 Morrison Trail, el.  
 Mount Holmes Trail, el.  
 Mount Washburn Spur Trail, el.  
 Mountain Creek Trail, el.  
 Natural Bridge Trail, el.  
 North Crandall Trail, el.  
 Open Creek Trail, el.  
 Pahaska Sunlight Trail, el.  
 Papoose Trail, el.  
 Pass Creek Trail, el.  
 Pelican Cone Trail, el.  
 Pelican Creek Trail, el.  
 Pilot Creek Trail, el.  
 Piney Creek Trail, el.  
 Plateau Trail, el.  
 Reef Creek Trail, el.  
 Republic Trail, el.  
 Rescue Creek Trail, el.  
 Rescue Creek Trail, el.  
 Ribbon Lake Trail, el.  
 Sepulcher Loop Trail, el.  
 Sevenmile Hole Trail, el.  
 Shoshone Trail, el.  
 Smuggler Gulch Trail, el.  
 Sour Creek Trail, el.  
 South Fork Trail, el.  
 South Fork Trail, el.  
 South Piney Trail, el.  
 Specimen Ridge Trail, el.  
 Sportsman Lake Trail, el.  
 Squaw Creek Trail, el.  
 Table Mountain Trail, el.  
 Tern Lake Trail, el.  
 Thorofare Trail, el.  
 Thunderer Cutoff Trail, el.  
 Timber Creek Trail, el.  
 Trout Creek Trail, el.  
 Upper Granite Loop Trail, el.  
 Venus Basin Trail, el.  
 Vick Creek Cutoff Trail, el.  
 Wapiti Lake Trail, el.  
 Warhouse Trail, el.  
 Wolf Lake Trail, el.  
 Yellowstone River Trail, el.  
 Yellowstone Trail, el.  
 Zig-Zag Trail, el.

See also
 List of trails in Wyoming

Notes

Geography of Park County, Wyoming
Historic trails and roads in Wyoming